Cedarvale or Cedar Vale may refer to:

 Cedarvale, dude ranch in Montana, United States 
 Cedarvale, New Mexico, United States 
 Cedarvale, Texas, United States 
 Cedar Vale, Kansas, United States 
 Cedar Vale, Queensland, Australia
 Cedarvale, British Columbia, Canada
 Cedarvale station (British Columbia)
 Cedarvale Park (Toronto)
 Cedarvale, Toronto, Ontario, a neighbourhood

See also 
Cedar (disambiguation)